Zouk Mosbeh Sporting Club, formerly Shooterz Club, is a multi-sports club based in Zouk Mosbeh, Lebanon. The club has consisted of various departments throughout their history, including futsal, women's football, table tennis, basketball, and kung fu.

Zouk Mosbeh's women's football department was founded in 2017. They competed in the Lebanese Women's Football League and won one league title and one FA Cup in the 2017–18 season, before being dissolved in 2019.

History

Women's football 
Zouk Mosbeh debuted in the 2017–18 season, winning the league and cup in their debut season. The following season, they came second both in the league and cup. The club was dissolved in 2019.

Honours

Men's futsal 
Lebanese Futsal League Second Division
Winners (1): 2017–18

Men's basketball 
Lebanese Basketball League Second Division
Winners (1): 2014–15

Women's football 
Lebanese Women's Football League
Winners (1): 2017–18
Lebanese Women's FA Cup
Winners (2): 2016–17, 2017–18
Runners-up (1): 2018–19
Lebanese Women's Super Cup
Winners (2; record): 2017–18, 2018–19

Women's futsal 
Lebanese Women's Futsal League
Winners (1): 2017–18

See also 

 Women's football in Lebanon
List of women's football clubs in Lebanon

References 

 
Women's football clubs in Lebanon
Defunct football clubs in Lebanon
Association football clubs established in 2017
Association football clubs disestablished in 2019
Futsal clubs in Lebanon
Basketball teams in Lebanon